Springtown is a town in Parker County and Wise County, Texas, United States. According to the 2020 census, the population was 3,064.

History
Originally named Littleton's Springs by Joseph Ward, an early settler, the community was renamed Springtown in the mid-1870s. Springtown's post office opened in 1875. Springtown was incorporated in 1884.

Population growth slowed during and after the Great Depression but resumed after 1960 due to commuters to and from Fort Worth.

Springtown was the site of College Hill Institute. The school was chartered by the State of Texas in 1884. It operated for ten years, and closed in 1894.

Geography

Springtown is located at  (32.967500, –97.682599).

Climate

The climate in this area is characterized by hot, humid summers and generally mild to cool winters.  According to the Köppen Climate Classification system, Springtown has a humid subtropical climate, abbreviated "Cfa" on climate maps.

Demographics

As of the 2020 United States census, there were 3,064 people, 1,018 households, and 761 families residing in the city.

Gallery

Notable people
Ona Dodd, Major League Baseball player.
William H. Murray, student at College Hill Institute and Governor of Oklahoma.
Jim Marrs, journalist and public relations consultant best known for his books and articles on a wide range of alleged cover-ups and conspiracies.

References

External links
 City of Springtown official website

Cities in Parker County, Texas
Cities in Wise County, Texas
Cities in Texas
Dallas–Fort Worth metroplex